Graham Ross may refer to:

Graham Ross (physicist) (1944–2021), British physicist
Graham Ross (musician) (born 1985), British conductor and composer
Graham Ross (rugby union) (1928–2009), Scotland rugby union player
Graham Ross (horticulturalist), (born 1947), Australian horticulturist